The 1941 Women's Western Open was a golf competition held at Cincinnati Country Club, which was the 12th edition of the event. Patty Berg won the championship in match play competition by defeating Mrs. Burt Weil in the final match, 7 and 6.

Women's Western Open
Golf in Ohio
Women's Western Open
Women's Western Open
1941 in sports in Ohio
Women's sports in Ohio